Thomazine or Thomasine Carew was an English courtier.

Thomazine Goldolphin was a daughter of Francis Godolphin and his first wife Margaret Killigrew.

In 1588 she married George Carew (d. 1612), a son of Thomas Carew of Antony

According to Dudley Carleton, Carew rode north to meet Anne of Denmark, wife of James VI, in June 1603, in an unsuccessful attempt to gain an office in her household.

Thomazine Carew, however, was appointed a lady-in-waiting to Anne of Denmark. The queen gave her gifts of clothes she had worn, including in February 1610 at Whitehall Palace, a black satin gown in a plain bias cut, and another black gown with blue "galloons" or lace strips. Lady Carew walked in the procession at Anne of Denmark's funeral in 1619 as a lady of the Privy Chamber.

As her husband had been ambassador in France from 1605 to 1609, she was sometimes known as "French lady Cary". There were discussions that the widowed "French Lady Cary" would marry Sir William Clarke (d. 1624).

The date of her death seems to be unknown. She outlived her son.

Marriage and children
Her children included:
 Francis Carew (died 1628).
 Louisa Carew, who married John Houston.
 Sophia Carew, who married Walter Stewart, and was the mother of La Belle Stuart.

In 1654 Louisa Houston petitioned Oliver Cromwell for a pension after the death of her mother.

References

Thomazine
Thomazine
16th-century births